Mick Jenkins may refer to:
Mick Jenkins (rugby league) (born 1972), Welsh rugby footballer
Mick Jenkins (rapper) (born 1991), American rapper

See also
Michael Jenkins (disambiguation)